Bidin is a surname. Notable people with the name include:

Abdulwahid Bidin (1925–1999), Filipino lawyer
Aznil Bidin (born 1994), Malaysian weightlifter

See also
Bidan (disambiguation)

Bidon (disambiguation)